Om Prakash Singh Karhana (born 11 January 1987) is an Indian shot putter. He trains at the Salwan Throws Academy, where he first began to learn how to shot put, and is supported by Olympic Gold Quest, a not-for-profit foundation to identify and support Indian athletes.  He was originally a basketball player, but was approached by Lalit Bhanot, secretary of the Athletics Federation of India, to consider switching to the shot put.

Om Prakash Karhana holds the Indian national record in shot put at 20.69 meters which he achieved in May 2012 at Szombathely, Hungary and he qualified for and competed at the 2012 London Olympics.  At the 2014 Commonwealth Games, he reached the final, finishing in 6th place.

References

External links 
 Om Prakash Karhana at Olympic Gold Quest

Indian male shot putters
People from Gurgaon district
Athletes from Haryana
Living people
1987 births
Athletes (track and field) at the 2012 Summer Olympics
Olympic athletes of India
Athletes (track and field) at the 2010 Asian Games
Athletes (track and field) at the 2014 Asian Games
Commonwealth Games competitors for India
Athletes (track and field) at the 2010 Commonwealth Games
Athletes (track and field) at the 2014 Commonwealth Games
Asian Games competitors for India
South Asian Games gold medalists for India
South Asian Games medalists in athletics